The Cutervo Province is one of the thirteen that make up the Cajamarca Region of Peru. It is the home of the Cutervo National Park. It has a population of 162,686 and an area .

Political division
It is divided into fifteen districts:
Cutervo
Callayuc
Choros
Cujillo
La Ramada
Pimpingos
Querocotillo
San Andrés de Cutervo
San Juan de Cutervo
San Luis de Lucma
Santa Cruz
Santo Domingo de la Capilla
Santo Tomás
Socota
Toribio Casanova

See also
Cajamarca Region
Cutervo National Park
Peru

References 

Provinces of the Cajamarca Region